The GLORY promotion was started in 2012.

This list is an up-to-date roster of those fighters currently under contract with the GLORY brand. Fighters are organized by weight class and within their weight class by their number of fights with the promotion.

Heavyweight (209+ Ibs, 95+ kg)

Light Heavyweight (209 Ibs, 95 kg)

Middleweight (187 Ibs, 85 kg)

Welterweight (170 Ib, 77 kg)

Lightweight (154 Ib, 70 kg)

Featherweight (143 Ib, 65 kg)

Women's Super Bantamweight (120 Ib, 55 kg)

See also
List of Glory champions
2023 in Glory

References

External links

fighters
Lists of mixed martial artists
Lists of living people